Berkel Westpolder is a metro station, as a part of the Rotterdam metro and the regional light rail system RandstadRail, located in Berkel en Rodenrijs, the Netherlands.

History
The RandstadRail station opened on 19 December 2008 for the RET Erasmuslijn metro service, currently line E. The station features 2 platforms, that are the same height as the train doors.

The station lies at the heart of a new housing development, called Westpolder/Bolwerk. The station was officially opened on 19 January 2009.

Train services
The following services currently call at Berkel Westpolder:

Bus services

 174 (Delft station - Delft TU (University) - Station Westpolder - Berkel en Rodenrijs - Bleiswijk - Bergschenhoek - Berkel en Rodenrijs - Station Westpolder - Delft TU (University) - Delft station)

Operated by Qbuzz, see www.qbuzz.nl or https://web.archive.org/web/20100305175339/http://www.qbuzz.nl/regio%2Brotterdam/cDU3_default.aspx

Railway stations opened in 2008
RandstadRail stations